Diéma Solar Power Station is a planned  solar power plant in Mali. The privately owned power plant is expected to sell the energy produced to the national electric utility, Energie du Mali (EDM-SA), under a 25-year power purchase agreement.

Location
The development would be located in the municipality of Diéma, in Diéma Cercle, in the Kayes Region of Mali.

Overview
The power station is under development by Pal 4 Solar Energy, an independent power producer (IPP), based out of the United Arab Emirates. The power station will produce 100 megawatts of power, which EDM-SA will purchase for 25 years from the date of commissioning, according to a concession agreement, signed between Pal 4 Solar Energy and Mali's Minister of Energy and Water.

The agreement between the two parties also stipulates that in addition to the solar power station, Pal 4 Solar Energy will build high voltage transmission lines from Diéma to Bamako, where the energy will be integrated into the national electricity grid.
Also a number of Malian towns will receive grid electricity for the first time, as part of this project. These communities include Nara, Nioro and Banamba.

Ownership
Diema Solar Power Station is owned by the entity that is developing it, Pal 4 Solar Energy.

Timeline
Once construction begins, the erection of the solar farm is expected to take 1.0 to 1.2 years to complete.

Other considerations
Mali's is in the process of increasing electricity access to its population, (26 percent in 2012, 35 percent in 2016). The target is to supply 87 percent of the population, with grid electricity by 2035. In that regard, the country is increasingly turning to solar energy. Current and future solar power plants include (a) the 50 megawatts Kita Solar Power Station, which came online in 2020 (b) the 100 megawatts Diéma Solar Power Station, in the planning phase and (c) the 93 megawatts Touna Solar Power Station, expected online in late 2022.

See also

List of power stations in Mali

References

External links
 Pal 4 Solar Energy to build a 100 MWp power plant in Diema As of 17 February 2020.

Renewable energy power stations in Mali
Solar power stations in Mali
Proposed renewable energy power stations in Mali
Kayes Region